Agua Buena Airport ,  is a rural airstrip  east-southeast of Collipulli, a town in the Araucanía Region of Chile.

See also

Transport in Chile
List of airports in Chile

References

External links
OpenStreetMap - Agua Buena
OurAirports - Agua Buena
FallingRain - Agua Buena Airport

Airports in La Araucanía Region